The US Yachts US 21 is an American trailerable sailboat that was designed by Clark Scarborough as a racer-cruiser and first built in 1982.

The US 21 design was developed into the Triton 21 in 1984, after Bayliner sold its US Yachts line of boats to Pearson Yachts.

Production
The design was built by US Yachts in the United States, starting in 1982, but production had ended by 1984 when the product line was sold to Pearson Yachts. The molds were the  used to build the very similar Triton 21.

Design
The US 21 is a recreational keelboat, built predominantly of fiberglass, with wood trim. It has a fractional sloop rig; a raked stem; an open, walk-through, reverse transom; a transom-hung rudder controlled by a tiller and a lifting keel. It displaces  and carries  of ballast.

The boat is normally fitted with a small  outboard motor for docking and maneuvering.

The design has sleeping accommodation for four people, with a double "V"-berth in the bow cabin and a two straight settee berths in the main cabin. The galley is located on the port side just aft of the bow cabin and is equipped with a sink. The head is located in the bow cabin on the port side under the "V"-berth.

Operational history
In a 2010 review Steve Henkel wrote, "best features: The U.S. 21's light weight should make her relatively easy to trailer, launch. and retrieve, though perhaps not as easily as the Newport 212. Her PHRF rating, well below that of her comps, intimates that she is fast. Worst features: Her high SA/D. wide beam, and low ballast compared to her comps may mean she needs more beef on the rail in heavy air to keep her upright."

See also
List of sailing boat types

References

Keelboats
1980s sailboat type designs
Sailing yachts 
Trailer sailers
Sailboat type designs by Clark Scarborough
Sailboat types built by US Yachts